Himu is a Bengali name. Notable people with the name include:

 Himu (character)
 Humaira Himu, Bangladeshi television and film actress
 Islam Mohamed Himu, Bangladeshi businessman

Bengali-language surnames